Rugby union in Senegal is a moderately popular sport. The Senegal national team is currently ranked 54th by World Rugby.

Governing body
The governing body is the Fédération Sénégalaise de Rugby.

History

Senegal is a founder member of the Confederation of African Rugby (CAR), which was launched officially in January 1986, in Tunis, Tunisia. Rugby officials from Tunisia, Morocco, Ivory Coast, Tanzania, Kenya, the Seychelles and Madagascar attended.

Senegal has a long-established union and players come from all walks of life.

Rugby has been played in Senegal by French colonialists since the 1920s, and they created a union in 1960. For 20 to 30 years rugby was a game only for the French colonists and the military.

Rugby was largely unknown among the Senegalese until the 1990s. In the late 1990s, the Fédération Sénégalaise de Rugby increased the visibility of the game among the Senegalese, with a new policy aiming to develop rugby in the schools.
Rugby took off in 2005 when Senegal participated in their first Rugby World Cup qualifying and played six international games.

In 2005, the national Rugby championships comprised just five clubs, all of them made up of French immigrants. Eight years later, there were 12 clubs, and all but one of them was fully Senegalese. In 2014, 18 clubs came to at least one of the national championships, whether it be men’s, women’s, Fifteens or Sevens.

This has led to the International Rugby Board increasing its development grant every year. The Senegalese federation has been growing rugby in Senegal. The Senegalese federation receives technical and training support from the IRB and the Confédération Africaine de Rugby (CAR), where professionals come to Senegal and deliver short, intensive courses.

National team

The Senegal national team has been playing regular international rugby since 2003. 
In 2005, Senegal participated in their first Rugby World Cup qualifying, and played six international games. The Senegalese union identified players of Senegal origin in France, and tried to build a stronger national team with expats to raise the profile of the game.

Senegal are ranked in the top ten in Africa and in the top 50 in the world. They have shown that they can compete with the other African countries: in 2012, they lost to Namibia by just two points, and by only three in 2008.

Players
Notable Senegalese players include Max Brito, who played for the Ivory Coast's national side, and had a notorious accident in the Rugby World Cup.

See also

 Senegal national rugby union team 
 Confederation of African Rugby
 Africa Cup

External links
 IRB Senegal page 
 official union page
 CAR
 Senegal on rugbydata.com
  Les S'en Fout le Score
 Charognards XV
 Le Fass Rugby Club
 Les Lionceaux (École de rugby)
 La page rugby du site au-senegal.com
 Le rugby au Sénégal vu par Franck Sansé (photographs)
 Senegal sanctioned for misconduct
 "Islam and Rugby" on the Rugby Readers review
 Archives du Rugby: Senegal

References

 
Sport in Senegal by sport